Szada is a village in Pest county, Budapest metropolitan area, Hungary.

References

Populated places in Pest County